Reegan Mimnaugh (born 18 December 2001) is a Scottish professional footballer who plays for Hamilton Academical, as a midfielder.

He was a participant in the Scottish Football Association's Performance School programme at Braidhurst High School.

In December 2019 he was linked with Fulham and Leeds United. He signed a new contract with Hamilton in April 2021.

References

2001 births
Living people
Scottish footballers
Hamilton Academical F.C. players
Scottish Professional Football League players
Association football midfielders
Sportspeople from Wishaw
Footballers from North Lanarkshire